Gordon is a town in Douglas County, Wisconsin, United States. The population was 645 at the 2000 census. The census-designated place of Gordon is located in the town. It was historically known as "Amick" (Amik), meaning beaver, indicating the town's significant fur-trading post alongside the Eau Claire River. The area was then called "Gordon" after half-French, half-Ojibwe pioneer and founder Antoine Gordon, who set up his convenience store and eventual commune next to the canoe stop and served as a landmark and rest stop for those traveling by.

Transportation
U.S. Highway 53 serves as a main route in the community.

Geography
According to the United States Census Bureau, the town has a total area of 157.4 square miles (407.7 km2), of which, 151.8 square miles (393.1 km2) of it is land and 5.6 square miles (14.6 km2) of it (3.58%) is water.

Demographics
As of the census of 2000, there were 645 people, 298 households, and 188 families residing in the town. The population density was 4.3 people per square mile (1.6/km2). There were 471 housing units at an average density of 3.1 per square mile (1.2/km2). The racial makeup of the town was 95.35% White, 0.31% African American, 1.55% Native American, 0.16% Asian, 0.62% from other races, and 2.02% from two or more races. Hispanic or Latino of any race were 0.62% of the population.

There were 298 households, out of which 21.5% had children under the age of 18 living with them, 52.7% were married couples living together, 5.4% had a female householder with no husband present, and 36.6% were non-families. 31.9% of all households were made up of individuals, and 14.1% had someone living alone who was 65 years of age or older. The average household size was 2.16 and the average family size was 2.68.

In the town, the population was spread out, with 19.7% under the age of 18, 5.0% from 18 to 24, 26.2% from 25 to 44, 29.9% from 45 to 64, and 19.2% who were 65 years of age or older. The median age was 45 years. For every 100 females, there were 109.4 males. For every 100 females age 18 and over, there were 112.3 males.

The median income for a household in the town was $34,412, and the median income for a family was $35,972. Males had a median income of $31,827 versus $19,844 for females. The per capita income for the town was $18,065. About 7.1% of families and 8.0% of the population were below the poverty line, including 9.1% of those under age 18 and 13.8% of those age 65 or over.

Notable people

 Philip B. Gordon, Roman Catholic priest, was born in the town
 Jake Patterson, Perpetrator of the kidnapping of Jayme Closs who is currently serving two life sentences without parole plus 40 years, was born in Gordon

References

External links
Gordon, WI – Community Website – Visitor Information

Towns in Douglas County, Wisconsin
Towns in Wisconsin